Hector McLean (1864 – January 1888) was an Australian-born rower who rowed in the Boat Race  and won Silver Goblets at Henley Royal Regatta.

McLean was the son of John Donald McLean, colonial treasurer of Queensland, Australia. He went to England where was educated at  New College, Oxford and rowed in the Oxford crew in the Boat Race three times in the 1885, 1886 and 1887 races, winning in 1885. Also in 1885, he won  Silver Goblets at Henley with his brother, Douglas McLean. In 1886 the McLean brothers were beaten in the final of the Silver Goblets by Stanley Muttlebury and Fraser Churchill. During the 1887 boat race his brother's oar broke. Oxford were behind at Barnes Railway Bridge, but Cambridge moved into rougher water too far over to the Surrey bank and Oxford were expecting to push through when the disaster struck. At Henley the McLeans were again runners up in Silver Goblets to Muttlebury and Charles Theodore Barclay.

McLean was Oxford president in 1887/8 but died of typhoid fever in the Guildford district at the age of 23.

References

External links
The Rowers of Vanity Fair/Nickalls D H - Wikibooks, collection of open-content textbooks at en.wikibooks.org

1864 births
1888 deaths
Alumni of New College, Oxford
English male rowers
Oxford University Boat Club rowers
Deaths from typhoid fever